Illi may refer to:

Arts, entertainment, and media
 illi (album), studio album by Taiwanese singer Wilber Pan

People
 Aleksander Illi (1912–2000), Estonian basketball player
 Nora Illi (1984–2020), Swiss Islamic preacher
Illi Gardner (born 1999), British racing cyclist

Places
 Illi, Armenia, a settlement in Shirak Province, Armenia
 Illi, Tartu County, a village in Tartu County, Estonia
 Illi Lake
 Illi, Võru County, a village in Võru County, Estonia
 Illi, Iran, a village in East Azerbaijan Province, Iran

See also
 Mont Illi, a department of Mayo-Kebbi Est, Chad
 Ili (disambiguation)
 Illy (disambiguation)